The Brick Album is the fifth studio album by The Greencards.

Track listing

Chart performance

References

2011 albums
The Greencards albums